The 1st Royal Tank Regiment (1 RTR) was an armoured regiment of the British Army. It is part of the Royal Tank Regiment, itself part of the Royal Armoured Corps and operationally under 12th Armoured Infantry Brigade.

History

Formation
The regiment was originally formed as A Company, Heavy Section, Machine Gun Corps in May 1916 during the First World War (1914–1918). It took part in the first ever tank offensive in 1916 and saw action on the Western Front again in the Battle of Cambrai in November 1917 and later in the Hundred Days Offensive. Remaining active in the army during the interwar period, in 1939 it was renamed the 1st Royal Tank Regiment.

Second World War

During the Second World War (1939–1945) the regiment took part in the Siege of Tobruk in the summer of 1941 and the Battle of El Alamein in October 1942, the advance up Italy in late 1943, the Normandy landings in June 1944 and the Western Allied invasion of Germany in 1945. From the Battle of El Alamein the regiment was part of the 22nd Armoured Brigade, itself part of the 7th Armoured Division, for the rest of the war.

Post war
After a period based in Germany, 1 RTR fought Communist forces during the Korean War.

The regiment was in the Suez Canal Zone as part of 25 Armoured Brigade to protect British interests in the Zone from in January 1954 to August 1955.

In 1957 the regiment was posted to Hong Kong as part of the 48th Gurkha Infantry Brigade. When it left Hong Kong in 1960 it replaced the Comet tanks with Centurions at Hohne, West Germany.

Amalgamation
In 1993, it amalgamated with the 4th Royal Tank Regiment without change of title. It incorporated both of the original regiments' traditional recruiting areas of Merseyside and Scotland.

In 1999, two squadrons were split off as part of the Joint NBC Regiment with No. 27 Squadron RAF Regiment. In December 2011 the Regiment handed over its responsibility for CBRN to the RAF Regiment.

On 25 June 2008 at Buckingham Palace, both 1RTR and 2 RTR were presented with their new Standard by The Queen, which included the new Battle Honour of Al Basrah 2003.

On 2 August 2014 the regiment merged with 2RTR to form the single battalion Royal Tank Regiment (RTR), based at Aliwal Barracks, Tidworth and is one of three armoured regiments equipped with the Challenger 2 tank.

The history and traditions of 1 RTR are preserved by 'Ajax" Squadron of the RTR.

Commanding Officers

The Commanding Officers have been:

|  style="text-align:left; width:50%; vertical-align:top;"|
1959–1961: Lt.-Col. Tresham D. Gregg
1961–1963: Lt.-Col. John D. Masters
1963–1966: Lt.-Col. Richard E. Simpkin
1966–1967: Lt.-Col. Laurie W.G. Gingell
1967–1969: Lt.-Col. Ian H. Baker
1969–1972: Lt.-Col. Simon J. Beardsworth
1972–1974: Lt.-Col. John P. Maxwel
1974–1976: Lt.-Col. Antony K.F. Walker
1976–1979: Lt.-Col. David L. Lewis
1979–1981: Lt.-Col. A.S. Jeremy Blacker
1981–1984: Lt.-Col. Michael Seymour
1984–1986: Lt.-Col. Michael I. Keun
1986–1989: Lt.-Col. Mark J.H. Goodson
1989–1991: Lt.-Col. Timothy E. Hall

|  style="text-align:left; width:50%; vertical-align:top;"|

1991–1993: Lt.-Col. Adrian G.R. Carroll
1993–1995: Lt.-Col. Peter Gilchrist
1995–1997: Lt.-Col. Ian J. Rodley
1997–2000: Lt.-Col. David C. Eccles
2000–2002: Lt.-Col. Christopher M. Deverell
2002–2004: Lt.-Col. Patrick J. Kidd
2004–2006: Lt.-Col. Hamish S. De Bretton-Gordon
2006–2009: Lt.-Col. Ian J. Gibb
2009–2011: Lt.-Col. Gavin J. Thompson
2011–2013: Lt.-Col. Andrew M. Britton
2013–2016: Lt.-Col. Nicholas J. Cowey
2016–2018: Lt.-Col. Simon A. Ridgway
2018–present: Lt.-Col. James R. Howard

Associated Cadet Forces
Mildenhall Detachment, Suffolk Army Cadet Force
Cadbury Heath Detachment, Bristol Army Cadet Force
Ainsdale Detachment, Merseyside Army Cadet Force
Westbury Detachment, Wiltshire Army Cadet Force
Oldham Detachment, Greater Manchester Army Cadet Force
131 (Battersea) Detachment, South West London Army Cadet Force

References

External links
 Official Army site
 History of 1 RTR

1-001 Royal Tank Regiment
1917 establishments in the United Kingdom
Military units and formations established in 1917